The Suncheon–Wanju Expressway() is an expressway in South Korea. It connects Suncheon to Wanju.

List of facilities

IC: Interchange, JC: Junction, SA: Service Area, TG:Tollgate

See also 
 Roads and expressways in South Korea
 Transportation in South Korea

External links 
 MOLIT South Korean Government Transport Department

 
Expressways in South Korea
Transport in South Jeolla Province
Suncheon
Wanju County
Transport in North Jeolla Province
Roads in South Jeolla
Roads in North Jeolla